Economic Group may refer to:

 Corporate group, a collection of parent and subsidiary corporations.
 Economic Group (Estonia)
 Economic Group (Saskatchewan)
 Socio-economic group